Krasnooktyabrsky District is an administrative district (raion), one of the forty in Nizhny Novgorod Oblast, Russia. Municipally, it is incorporated as Krasnooktyabrsky Municipal District. It is located in the southeast of the oblast. 

Its administrative center is the rural locality (a selo) of Urazovka. Population: 11,729 (2010 Census);  

The population of Urazovka accounts for 13.9% of the district's total population.

History
The district was established in 1929 and given its present name in 1930.

References

Notes

Sources

Districts of Nizhny Novgorod Oblast
 
